Africa Risen: A New Era of Speculative Fiction is a speculative fiction anthology edited by Sheree Renée Thomas, Zelda Knight, and Oghenechovwe Donald Ekpeki featuring 32 original works of fiction. It was published in 2022 by Tor Publishing.

Development and inspiration 
The anthology serves as a third volume to the Dark Matter anthology series edited by Thomas from 1998 to 2004.
The first book published in this Dark Matter anthology was produced at the turn of the new millennium, the award winning A Century of Speculative Fiction from the African Diaspora (2000). The second book in the Dark Matter series was the equally lauded World Fantasy Award for Best Anthology winner, Reading the Bones (2004).

According to Thomas, Dominion: An Anthology of Speculative Fiction From Africa and the African Diaspora re-kindled the desire to edit an anthology of Africans and Africans in the Diaspora when Ekpeki reached out to her. The name of the anthology was supposed to be Africa Rising, but was changed because according to Thomas "Africa has risen".

Content 
Source:
 "The Blue House" by Dilman Dila
 "March Magic" by WC Dunlap
 "IRL" by Steven Barnes
 "The Deification of Igodo" by Joshua Omenga
 "Mami Wataworks" by Russell Nichols
 "Rear Mirror" by Nuzo Onoh
 "Door Crashers" by Franka Zeph
 "The Soul Would Have No Rainbow" by Yvette Lisa Ndlovu
 "A Dream of Electric Mothers" by Wole Talabi
 "Simbi" by Sandra Jackson-Opoku
 "Housewarming for a Lion Goddess" by Aline-Mwezi Niyonsenga
 "A Knight in Tunisia" by Alex Jennings
 "The Devil Is Us" by Mirette Bahgat
 "Cloud Mine" by Timi Odueso
 "Ruler of the Rear Guard" by Maurice Broaddus
 "Peeling Time (Deluxe Edition)" by Tlotlo Tsamaase
 "The Sugar Mill" by Tobias S. Buckell
 "The Carving of War" by Somto Ihezue Onyedikachi
 "Ghost Ship" by Tananarive Due
 "Liquid Twilight" by Ytasha Womack
 "Once Upon a Time in 1967" by Oyedotun Damilola Muees
 "A Girl Crawls in a Dark Corner" by Alexis Brooks de Vita
 "The Lady of the Yellow-Painted Library" by Tobi Ogundiran
 "When the Mami Wata Met a Demon" by Moustapha Mbacké Diop
 "The Papermakers" by Akua Lezli Hope
 "A Soul of Small Places" by Mame Bougouma Diene and Woppa Diallo
 "Air to Shape Lungs" by Shingai Njeri Kagunda
 "Hanfo Driver" by Ada Nnadi
 "Exiles of Witchery" by Ivana Akotowaa Ofori
 "The Taloned Beast" by Chinelo Onwualu
 "Star Watchers" by Danian Darrell Jerry
 "Biscuit & Milk" by Dare Segun Falowo

Themes 
The themes in the anthology are Afrofuturism, Africanfuturism, climate, gender, LGBT and religion.

Reception 
It is nominated for the 2023 NAACP Image Awards for Outstanding Literary Work – Fiction. NPR named it amongst their Best of the Year pick.
It earned a starred review from Publishers Weekly and Booklist. In the Publishers Weekly review, it was called "a magnificent and wide-ranging anthology..." noting that it is "a must-read for all genre fans."

Booklist called it "a significant addition to the canon of modern speculative fiction." while Library Journal considered it "a welcome introduction to speculative writers from the African continent and the African diaspora."
Isiah Lavender III in a review for Locus praised the work for an outstanding collection.

See also

 Africanfuturism
 Afrofuturism
 Black science fiction
 Dark Matter: A Century of Speculative Fiction from the African Diaspora
 Africa Rising concept
 Samuel R. Delany

External links
 Official Website of Sheree Renée Thomas
 Sheree Thomas' Author Page on AALBC
 Black Science Fiction and Fantasy on NPR (audio)
 Dark Matter: A Century of Speculative Fiction from the African Diaspora (2000)
 Africa Rising concept
 Samuel R. Delany

References 

2020 anthologies
American anthologies
Nigerian anthologies
Science fiction anthologies
Horror anthologies
African diaspora literature
Africanfuturism
2020s science fiction works